Narsingdi-5 is a constituency represented in the Jatiya Sangsad (National Parliament) of Bangladesh since 1996 by Rajiuddin Ahmed Raju of the Awami League.

Boundaries 
The constituency encompasses Raipura Upazila.

History 
The constituency was created in 1984 from the Dhaka-26 constituency when the former Dhaka District was split into six districts: Manikganj, Munshiganj, Dhaka, Gazipur, Narsingdi, and Narayanganj.

Ahead of the 2008 general election, the Election Commission redrew constituency boundaries to reflect population changes revealed by the 2001 Bangladesh census. The 2008 redistricting altered the boundaries of the constituency.

Ahead of the 2014 general election, the Election Commission expanded the boundaries of the constituency to include all of Raipura Upazila. Previously it had excluded three union parishads: Daukar Char, Marjal, and Uttar Bakharnagar.

Members of Parliament

Elections

Elections in the 2010s 
Rajiuddin Ahmed Raju was re-elected unopposed in the 2014 general election after opposition parties withdrew their candidacies in a boycott of the election.

Elections in the 2000s

Elections in the 1990s

References

External links
 

Parliamentary constituencies in Bangladesh
Narsingdi District